The 1932 Northwestern Wildcats team represented Northwestern University during the 1932 Big Ten Conference football season. In their sixth year under head coach Dick Hanley, the Wildcats compiled a 3–4–1 record (2–3–1 against Big Ten Conference opponents) and finished in fifth place in the Big Ten Conference.

Schedule

References

Northwestern
Northwestern Wildcats football seasons
Northwestern Wildcats football